Stop-Zemlia  (Ukrainian: Стоп-Земля) is a 2021 Ukrainian romance, coming-of-age and drama film directed and written by Ukrainian director Kateryna Gornostai, and starring Maria Fedorchenko, Arsenii Markov, Yana Isaienko and Oleksandr Ivanov. The feature film portrays a teenage coming of age story. All the depicted events are fiction, but creative team attempted to portray them as improvisations. The characters had a set of activities when the script was written, but they gained traits once the actors were found. The film was first released on May 3, 2021 in Berlin International Film Festival, and received the Crystal Bear for the Best Film in the Generation 14plus competition. The film received positive reviews from critics. Later the film appeared at the 12th Odesa International Film Festival (OIFF) on August 19, 2021, where the film received the main award of the festival - the Grand Prix.  Kateryna Gornostai also became the winner of Duke in the nomination Best Full-Length Film. On March 9, 2022, the film was awarded the Taras Shevchenko National Prize of Ukraine.

The film's director, Kateryna Gornostai, opened the presentation by stating that the title 'Stop-Zemlia' is important to the film's success, and the film ended up keeping the same title in English, as so not to lose its intended impact. Kateryna spent about a year looking for real people to play the heroine and the class of students, and the chosen actors then underwent a 7 week acting workshop together before filming began.

Plot 
16-year-old Masha is studying in an ordinary high school in Kyiv. Her close friends Yana and Senia help her not to feel strange and detached in the class, living in their own way through busy school days. In addition to worry about future exams, Masha is forced to leave her comfort zone when falling in love with her classmate Sasha. She understands that if she does not dare to ask, she will never know whether her love for a guy is mutual.

While focusing on Masha, the film also switches to perspectives of Senia, Yana and Sasha throughout to offer a fuller picture of their lives and relationships.

Cast 

 Maria Fedorchenko as Masha Chernykh
 Arsenii Markov as Senia Steshenko
 Yana Isaienko as Yana Bratiychuk
 Oleksandr Ivanov as Sasha Hanskyi
 Andrii Abalmazov as Andrii Klymyshyn
 Rubin Abukhatab as Rubin Zhuravlov
 Marharyta Astakhova as Margo Osipova
 Oksana Babych as Oksana Herasymenko
 Inna Belikova as Masha’s mother
 Sehiy Derevyanko as Masha’s father
 Marta Dolesko as Marta Belska
 Kateryna Gornostai as herself
 Daniel Khoroshavin as Dania Andronov
 Kateryna Kozlova as Katia Shydlovska
 Viktoriia Kravchenko as the Biology teacher
 Nika Krykun as Nika Polonska
 Nastya Kulchytska as Nastia Shchukina
 Nina Makarchuk as Nina Alenych
 Yeva Nahorna as Yeva Hulak
 Olesya Ostrovska as Sasha’s mother
 Ivan Perepechechenko as Vania Dychenko
 Solomia Savchak as Solia Velychko
 Lev Shurov as ‘Mouse’ Ostashchenko
 Artem Sliusarenko as Artem Dzhun
 Olena Tolmachova as Lena Lynnyk
 Polina Vorona as Polina Chorna
 Dymytrii Yaroshenko as Matvii Chernykh (Masha’s brother)
 Anton Tejov as Anton Kapko
 Sofia Yevmina as Sonia Konovalenko
 Daryna Yurchyshyn as Darka Hnatyk
 Mykyta Zhernosiekov as Nikita Zhardetski

Release 

The German company Pluto Film acquired the international distribution rights to Stop-Zemlia in February 2021. Altered Innocence purchased the film's American distribution rights in March 2021. The Ukrainian Arthouse Traffic had already bought the film's Ukrainian distribution rights prior to that.

On March 1, 2021, the film was released via online digital access during the 71st Berlin International Film Festival's (a.k.a. Berlinale) Generation 14plus competition. The film was physically presented at the Berlinale on June 9, 2021.

On November 4, 2021, the film was released in limited theaters in Ukraine.

On January 21, 2022, the film was released in select theaters in the USA, and paid streaming on Amazon and Youtube.

At the beginning of March, 2022, Altered Innocence released a limited amount of copies of Stop-Zemlia on DVD.

Box office 
The film's budget was ₴25.72 million, approximately, €829,000. Currently, 92 percent of the tape's funding comes from the sponsorship of Ukrainian state film agency with the remainder of the budget being covered by partnerships. It grossed and took a worldwide total of $143,434.

Reception 

 "The film convincingly covers a variety of important topics which appeal to us as young people. Platonic love, queerness, solidarity and psychological stress reinforce the effect of the film as an authentic coming-of-age story. By virtue of creative visualisation techniques, it becomes clear in an artistic manner how our generation dreams, feels and experiences life. The message is conveyed that it is part of life to face certain fears in order to be able to enjoy the most exciting years of youth" - Statement of the Youth Jury, Berlinale.
 "Emotional and subjective realism takes precedence in this otherwise naturalistic and observational film" - Katie Walsh, Los Angeles Times.
 "Gornostai’s strengths are also evident in her recreations of adolescent egoism" - Elizabeth Weitzman, The Wrap.

See also 

 55th Karlovy Vary International Film Festival
 List of LGBT-related films of 2021

References

External links 

2021 films
2021 drama films
Ukrainian drama films
Ukrainian LGBT-related films
2021 LGBT-related films
LGBT-related drama films